Presidential elections will be held in Slovakia no later than April 2024 according to the Constitution of Slovakia. The first round of the last presidential election was held on 16 March 2019, so the next election is expected to be held on 17 March 2024. It may, however, be held earlier under exceptional circumstances such as the resignation or death of the President.

The incumbent president Zuzana Čaputová is eligible to run for another term. No candidates have yet officially announced their candidacy.

Electoral system
The President of Slovakia is elected using the two-round system; if no candidate gains a majority in the first round, a runoff will be held between the top-two candidates.

Candidates

Announced
No candidates have yet officially announced their candidacy.

Speculative
Zuzana Čaputová, incumbent President. She has not ruled out her candidacy for re-election.
Robert Fico, incumbent leader and MP of SMER–SD, former Prime Minister and 2014 presidential candidate. He has not ruled out his second presidential candidacy. He is considered the strongest potential candidate of his party.
Štefan Harabin, former judge, former chief justice of the Supreme Court of Slovakia, former Minister of Justice of Slovakia and 2019 presidential candidate. He claimed his intention to run in the election upon his arrest for "approval of Russia's attack on Ukraine" in May 2022, and confirmed his intention in February 2023.
Martin Jakubec, businessman, singer, TV presenter and producer. He announced his presidential candidacy in the 2019 election, but failed to meet the minimal age requirement. He ran in the 2022 Slovak local elections as a candidate of People's Party Our Slovakia for the Mayor of Bratislava, receiving 1.39%. In March 2020, he announced on his Facebook profile that he will run for the 2024 presidential election, but it remains unclear whether he has started collecting the 15,000 citizen or 15 MP signatures.
Robert Mistrík, researcher, entrepreneur and co-founder of SaS. He ran in the previous presidential election, but later withdrew his candidacy and endorsed Zuzana Čaputová.
Peter Weiss, diplomat, former leader of the SDĽ and former ambassador to the Czech Republic and Hungary. He is rumoured to be the candidate of HLAS–SD.
Maroš Žilinka, incumbent Prosecutor General of Slovakia. Although he denies the claims that he will run in the election, some journalists, politologists and politicians, including the Minister of Defence Jaroslav Naď, still speculate about Žilinka's candidacy.

Opinion polls

First round

Others

References

2024
Slovakia
Slovakia